James Moore (18 September 1877 – 6 April 1933) was a New Zealand cricketer. He played two first-class matches for Otago in 1905/06.

See also
 List of Otago representative cricketers

References

External links
 

1877 births
1933 deaths
New Zealand cricketers
Otago cricketers
New Zealand emigrants to Australia